A by-election was held for the New South Wales Legislative Assembly electorate of Parramatta on 20 May 1872 caused by the resignation of sitting member Hugh Taylor immediately after the election as he had received conflicting legal advice as to whether his contract to supply articles to a destitute institution disqualified him from office. He was concerned that the Committee of Elections and Qualifications was hostile to the Parkes ministry which he supported.

Dates

Results

Hugh Taylor resigned because a contract he had may have been an office of profit under the crown.

See also
Electoral results for the district of Parramatta
List of New South Wales state by-elections

References

1872 elections in Australia
New South Wales state by-elections
1870s in New South Wales